Günther Lemmerer (born 4 April 1952, in Graz) was an Austrian luger who competed in the early 1980s. He won the gold medal in the men's doubles event at the 1982 FIL European Luge Championships in Winterberg, West Germany.

Competing in two Winter Olympics, Lemmerer earned his best finish of fifth in the men's doubles event at Sarajevo in 1984.

He won the men's doubles overall Luge World Cup title three times (1979–80, 1980-1, 1981-2).

After retiring from competition in the mid-1980s, Lemmerer became a development coach for the International Luge Federation (FIL), developing luge teams from Greece, Bermuda, India, Somalia, Argentina, and Venezuela. Several of those teams competed at the 1998 Winter Olympics in Nagano and 2002 Winter Olympics in Salt Lake City, Utah, U.S.A., but did not medal in any luge event.

References

External links
 1980 Winter Olympic men's doubles results
 1984 Winter Olympic men's doubles results
 List of men's doubles luge World Cup champions since 1978
 Washington Post February 12, 1998 article on Lemmerer's coaching role in growing luge as a sport

1952 births
Living people
Austrian male lugers
Olympic lugers of Austria
Lugers at the 1980 Winter Olympics
Lugers at the 1984 Winter Olympics
Sportspeople from Graz